Asia Capital Reinsurance Group ("Asia Capital Re") is a Singapore-based reinsurance company. ACR is ranked among the world's top 50 reinsurers.

Asia Capital Re is one of the noted local players for reinsurance in the regional reinsurance market.

ACR ReTakaful Holdings is a joint venture between Dubai Islamic Investment Group, Khazanah Nasional Berhad, the investment arm of the Malaysian Government and Asia Capital Reinsurance.

References

Financial services companies established in 2006
Insurance companies of Singapore
Reinsurance companies